Ali ben Aïssa, also known as Ali ben Aissa, or Aïssa Mahmed El Fergani, born sometime in the 18th century at Beni ferguén El-Milia, was an Algerian commander, and one of the favorites of Ahmed Bey. He also served as Khaznadji, the most important position in the Beylik of Constantine behind the Bey. He was from the Beni Fergan tribe.

References 

Algerian resistance leaders
Ottoman Algeria
Kabyle people
Algerian people
North African people
Berber people